The 2001 Women's World Amateur Boxing Championships was an international women's boxing competition hosted by the United States from October 21 to 27 2001 in Scranton, Pennsylvania. The competition was the first women’s world amateur boxing championships.

Results
Bronze medals are awarded to both losing semi-finalists.

 71 Kg Drapeau Russian Natalya Kolpakova gain silver medals but disqualified and deprived of their silver medals in 2001 Women's World Amateur Boxing Championships, which were not transferred to other athletes.

Medal count table

References

Boxing
Women's World Boxing Championships
Women's World Amateur Boxing Championships
2001 in women's boxing
Scranton, Pennsylvania
2001 in American women's sports
October 2001 sports events in the United States
Sports competitions in Pennsylvania
Women's sports in Pennsylvania